Alex Yam Ziming (born 1981) is a Singaporean politician who has been serving as Mayor of North West District since 2020. A member of the governing People's Action Party (PAP), he has been the Member of Parliament (MP) representing the Yew Tee division of Marsiling–Yew Tee GRC since 2011.

Education
Yam was born in 1981 at Mount Alvernia Hospital to Yam Kah Heng and Lucy Yeo. He attended Maris Stella High School, Dunman High School and Victoria Junior College. 

He completed a master's degree in politics and international relations, concentrating on North Asian politics and communitarianism at the University of Kent in 2005. 

While he was at the University of Kent, he was elected to the Union Council, representing ethnic minorities and international students. He was also concurrently the co-president of the university chaplaincy.

Early career
In 2000, Yam was awarded the National Volunteers Award by the Life Insurance Association of Singapore. From 2005 to 2006, he worked at the National University of Singapore. Yam joined the National Trades Union Congress in 2006 and was Head of Strategies & Planning and Head of Youth Lab while also serving with the Singapore Industrial & Services Employees' Union as a consultant.

From 2006 to 2009, Yam served as secretary to Environment Minister Lim Swee Say in the Buona Vista Citizen's Consultative Committee and was also Chairman of the Youth Wing, having succeeded Liang Eng Hwa in both roles when Liang entered politics. He subsequently served in the Yew Tee Citizen's Consultative Committee and the Yew Tee Community Club Management Committee from 2009 to 2011 before standing for elections in Yew Tee to replace outgoing Member of Parliament Yeo Cheow Tong.

Political career

Early political work and electoral history
Yam was previously secretary of the Young PAP general branch and executive committee member of the Young PAP EXCO. Yam was first sworn in as a Member of Parliament for Chua Chu Kang GRC on 7 May 2011, following the 2011 general election.  In the 2015 general election, the Yew Tee division was redrawn into the new Marsiling–Yew Tee GRC. He was re-elected as Member of Parliament for Yew Tee on 11 September 2015 with Lawrence Wong, Halimah Yacob and Ong Teng Koon. In the 2020 general election, he retained his seat with Lawrence Wong, Zaqy Mohamad and Hany Soh.

Yam was appointed by the PAP Central Executive Committee as deputy executive director of the PAP in 2012. He became executive director upon the retirement of Lau Ping Sum in early 2013. He relinquished his full-time role in the National Trades Union Congress and became Advisor to the United Workers of Petroleum Industries and the Reuters Local Employees Union.

Parliamentary appointments
Yam was the deputy chairman of the Defence and Foreign Affairs Government Parliamentary Committee (GPC) and sat on the Culture, Community & Youth GPC and the Social & Family Development GPC in the 12th Parliament.

In the 13th Parliament, Yam was elected chairman of the newly created National Development GPC and concurrently serves in the Culture, Community and Youth GPC.

Prior to the swearing-in of the 14th Parliament, Yam was elected as deputy chairman of the Defence and Foreign Affairs GPC, as well as Communications and Information GPC.

Yam is a member of the Estimates Committee since the 2nd session of the 13th Parliament which examines the government's budget. He serves as an executive committee member of the Singapore Parliamentary Society and chairs the Singapore - Australia, New Zealand and the Pacific Regional Parliamentary Group.

Appointment as Mayor
In the naming his new Cabinet, Prime Minister Lee Hsien Loong appointed Yam as the Mayor of the North West District on 27 July 2020, overseeing 19 constituencies and serving over 906,000 residents.

Legislative focus
Yam is a member of the Animal Welfare Legislative Review Committee and Chairman of the Multi-Stakeholder Consultative Committee for the Codes of Animal Welfare. Together with Yeo Guat Kwang, he moved a Private Member's Bill to amend the Animal & Birds Act to strengthen animal welfare legislation in 2014.

Yam has also actively championed anti-human trafficking legislation, supporting Christopher de Souza's Private Member's Bill targeting traffickers and protecting victims. A political scientist by training, Yam is interested in international relations and political systems, as well as the study of communitarian democracies. A built environment which is sensitive to heritage, cultural and community-building were his foci for national development issues. He also advocates strongly for pro-family policies, religious and racial harmony, anti-human trafficking legislation and care for the vulnerable.

External committee appointments
Since 2009, Yam has served as a board member of the Chinese Development Assistance Council (CDAC). From October 2015, he chaired the Outreach Committee of the CDAC, having taken over from Grace Fu. He was later the Chairman of the newly formed Fulfilling Ageing Committee from November 2015, handing leadership of the Outreach Committee to Ong Ye Kung.

Yam has served on the National Committee for Youth Guidance & Rehabilitation (NYGR) since 2011. He was a member of the National Youth Council. He co-chaired the Sports & Arts (SPAR) sub-committee with Tin Pei Ling and was involved in the launch of the YEAH! Centre as part of the Youth Employment System (YES). He was a full member of the National Committee on Prevention, Rehabilitation and Recidivism (NCPR), which replaced the NYGR, from 2018 to 2020.

A PCF graduate himself, Yam was appointed as a member of the Council of Management of the PAP Community Foundation in 2011 and is also a member of its Executive Committee. He sits on the Appointments & Nominations Committee.

He is a member of the National Steering Committee on Racial & Religious Harmony and is an advisor to the People's Association Integration Council as well as the Panel of Advisors for Community Engagement.

Party appointments
Yam was appointed as Assistant Organising Secretary of the PAP on 23 November 2018 following the central executive committee elections. He has been a member of the central executive committee since 19 November 2020.

Personal life
Yam has Cantonese heritage. His paternal grandfather, Yam Kok Yuen, was a Cantonese community leader representing Heshan and Zhaoqing clansmen and a founding member of the Malayan Chinese Association in Singapore.

Yam is a Roman Catholic convert, and is married to Jocelyn Alexandra Wong. They have three sons and a daughter. He and his wife are active in their parish and neighbourhood community and also lead a church support group for families who have suffered miscarriages, stillbirths or abortions. He was a pro-tem committee member of CANA Catholic Centre.

Other activities
 International Catholic Legislators Network (ICLN), member
 Asia-Pacific Catholic Legislators Network (APCLN), co-president

See also
 List of Singapore MPs
 List of current Singapore MPs

References

External links
 Alex Yam on Parliament of Singapore

|-

|-

|-

1981 births
Living people
Singaporean Roman Catholics
Victoria Junior College alumni
Singaporean people of Cantonese descent
Singaporean trade unionists
Dunman High School alumni
Alumni of the University of Kent
Members of the Parliament of Singapore